Chandler School is an independent, co-ed day school for students in kindergarten through grade eight located in Pasadena, California United States, founded in 1950. School enrollment is 450 students. The  campus overlooks the Pasadena Rose Bowl and the Arroyo Seco.

History
In 1950, Thomas and Catherine Chandler founded the Chandler School in Altadena with an initial enrollment of 14 students in grades four through eight. After eight years, the school outgrew the original Altadena campus, and with the help of 40 parents, a down payment was raised to purchase the present Armada Drive property. Construction was completed one room at a time with donated materials and labor. A Board of Trustees was formed and Chandler became a 501(c) 3 non-profit institution. The site at 1005 Armada Drive welcomed students for classes on September 20, 1958, with just two buildings and an athletic field.

After this, the school continued to expand – the first kindergarten class enrolled in 1963. Construction on the original South Campus began in 1970 and was completed in 1972.

In 1976, when founder Thomas Chandler retired, Arthur L.P. Brown became Chandler School's second Head of School.

By 1979, 366 students were being instructed in kindergarten through eighth grade. That same year, Jefferson C. Stephens, Jr. became Chandler's third Head of School.

The gymnasium-multipurpose building was added in 1981.

Thomas A. Chandler died in 1996, but his wife Catherine remains active in the school community. In 1998, the Pasadena Planning Commission approved Chandler's 10-year Master Plan and the Chandler 2000 Lower School Project. Construction on the new project began in 2000 and was completed in 2001 – the same year John Finch became Chandler's fourth Head of School.

Chandler welcomed 450 students, the largest enrollment in school history, to its new South Campus in the fall of 2011, featuring a Middle School classroom building, a renovated gym, and outdoor sports court.

Technology 
Chandler instituted an integrated technology curriculum in 2005 requiring each Middle School student to bring a personal laptop to school every day. This allows for technology education to be part of the regular curriculum, instead of an independent component, better reflecting recent trends in higher education and professional technology usage.

STEAM Curriculum 
Chandler adopted a STEAM curriculum in 2013, providing an opportunity for each grade level to work on a project that synthesizes science, technology, engineering, art, and math. Chandler hosts a STEAM Night during which all nine grades present the results of their year-long STEAM projects. Projects have included a miniature golf course and a city made of boxes displayed on an outdoor sport court.

Athletics 
The school's founder, Thomas Chandler, graduated from the Webb School with letters in football, tennis and track. He worked as a coach at Webb until he was recruited into the U.S. Navy during World War II. Chandler developed his approach to education and coaching while at the Webb School. He believed “First of all, sports are to be enjoyed and second of all, sports are meant to build strong character, strong bodies, mind and spirit, in a team setting.”

Chandler Athletic Program Units include badminton, basketball, baseball, bicycle riding, bowling, a circus unit (unicycling, diabolo, juggling and stilt-walking), football, golf, gymnastics, lacrosse, paddle tennis, roller hockey, skateboarding, soccer, swimming, T-ball, track, ultimate frisbee, and volleyball.

Notable alumni
Charles Webb, author of the novel The Graduate
John Battelle, author, journalist, and co-founder of Wired magazine
Mo Martin, professional golfer

Sources 
 Private Independent Schools, Bunting and Lyon, Inc., 2009, Wallingford, CT. p. 13, </references>
 Lisa Vandergriff, "Chandler Puts Focus on Back to School" Pasadena Outlook, Thursday  Sept. 10, 2009 Vol. 3 No. 37
"Athletic Program at Chandler", Shamrock, Summer 2009, vol. XIX No. 2
 Sarah Haufrect, "How to Get in to Your Dream School Pasadena", Pasadena, August 2009, Issue 8, pp. 29 – 39
 Chandler School's Annual Report 2007 - 2008

References

External links 

Chandler's NAIS Page

Private middle schools in Los Angeles County, California
Private elementary schools in Los Angeles County, California
Schools in Pasadena, California
Educational institutions established in 1950
1950 establishments in California
Private K–8 schools in California